Lower Holker is a civil parish in the South Lakeland district of the English county of Cumbria.  It includes the villages of Cark and Flookburgh, the hamlets of Holker, Ravenstown and Sand Gate, and historic Holker Hall. In the 2001 census the parish had a population of 1,808, increasing at the 2011 census to 1,869.

In chronostratigraphy, the British sub-stage of the Carboniferous period, the 'Holkerian' derives its name from Holker Hall.

See also

Listed buildings in Lower Holker

References

External links
 Cumbria County History Trust: Holker, Lower (nb: provisional research only – see Talk page)

Civil parishes in Cumbria